The Manatee of Helena is a creature believed to have once inhabited the coast of Saint Helena, an island supposed to be largely populated by manatees during the days of colonization. Unlike known manatee species, Helena manatees were semi-aquatic, often coming onto land like seals. There is no evidence to prove its existence, and only two eyewitness accounts have been reported. Elephant seals historically bred on the island.

References

Fauna of Saint Helena
Legendary mammals
Purported mammals
Sirenians